Live at the Blue Note is a live album by the flugelhornist Franco Ambrosetti which was recorded in New York in 1992 and released on the Enja label the following year.

Reception

The AllMusic review by Scott Yanow called it a "Lively club date" and stated "Ambrosetti has long been able to hold his own with Americans ... The music is hard bop, and Ambrosetti comes up with fresh statements ... This is just one in a series of excellent Ambrosetti sets for Enja, all of which are easily recommended".

Track listing
 Introduction – 0:17
 "Blues 'n' Dues Et Cetera" (George Gruntz) – 13:23
 "Just Friends" (John Klenner, Sam M. Lewis) – 7:36
 "Body and Soul" (Johnny Green, Frank Eyton, Edward Heyman, Robert Sour) – 12:28	
 "Phantoms" (Kenny Barron) – 18:56
 "Voyage" (Barron) – 9:26

Personnel
Franco Ambrosetti – flugelhorn
Seamus Blake – tenor saxophone
Kenny Barron – piano
Ira Coleman – bass
Victor Lewis – drums

References

Franco Ambrosetti albums
1993 live albums
Enja Records live albums
Albums recorded at the Blue Note Jazz Club